A pancreatic cyst is a fluid filled sac within the pancreas.

Causes range from benign to malignant. Pancreatic cysts can occur in the setting of pancreatitis, though they are only reliably diagnosed 6 weeks after the episode of acute pancreatitis.

Benign tumors such as serous cystadenomas can occur. Main branch intraductal papillary mucinous neoplasms (IPMNs) are associated with dilatation of the main pancreatic duct, while side branch IPMNs are typically benign, and not associated with dilatation. MRCP can help distinguish the position of the cysts relative to the pancreatic duct, and direct appropriate treatment and follow-up. The most common malignancy that can present as a pancreatic cyst is a mucinous cystic neoplasm.

Follow up guidelines
Cysts from 1–5 mm on CT or ultrasound are typically too small to characterize and considered benign. No further imaging follow-up is recommended for these lesions. Cysts from 6–9 mm require a single follow-up in 2–3 years, preferably with magnetic resonance cholangiopancreatography (MRCP) to better evaluate the pancreatic duct.  If stable at follow-up, no further imaging follow-up is recommended. For cysts from 1–1.9 cm follow-up is suggested with MRCP or multiphasic CT in 1–2 years. If stable at follow-up, the interval of imaging follow-up is increased to 2–3 years. Cysts from 2–2.9 cm have more malignant potential, and a baseline endoscopic ultrasound is suggested, followed by MRCP or multiphasic CT in 6–12 months. If patients are young, surgery may be considered to avoid the need for prolonged surveillance. If these cysts are stable at follow-up, interval imaging follow-up can be done in 1–2 years.

References

External links 
 Scholten L, van Huijgevoort N, C, M, van Hooft J, E, Besselink M, G, Del Chiaro M: Pancreatic Cystic Neoplasms: Different Types, Different Management, New Guidelines. Visc Med 2018;34:173-177. doi: 10.1159/000489641  Review article  

Pancreas disorders
Cysts